David Armand (born 1980) is an American writer of fiction, non-fiction, and poetry. He has published four novels, The Pugilist's Wife, Harlow, The Gorge, and The Lord's Acre. He has also published three collections of poems, The Deep Woods, Debt, and The Evangelist as well as a memoir titled My Mother's House. From 2017-2019 he served as Writer-in-Residence at Southeastern Louisiana University, where he is currently assistant professor of creative writing. His latest book, a collection of essays called Mirrors, was published by the University of Louisiana at Lafayette Press. Armand is the 2022 recipient of the Louisiana Writer Award,  presented annually by the Louisiana Center for the Book in the State Library of Louisiana. He is the twenty-third recipient of the prestigious award presented to recognize outstanding contributions to Louisiana’s literary and intellectual life exemplified by a contemporary Louisiana writer’s body of work.

Honors 
 2022 Louisiana Writer Award 
 2020 University of Louisiana System Outstanding Faculty Member of the Year 
 2016 St. Tammany Parish President's Literary Artist of the Year 
 2016 Southeastern Louisiana University President's Award for Excellence in Artistic Activity 
Gambit Magazine "40 Under 40" Recipient 
 2015 Southeastern Louisiana University College of Arts, Humanities, and Social Sciences Alumnus of the Year Award
The Gorge named a finalist in Foreword Reviews Independent Book Awards 
Selected as a contributor to the 2014 Sewanee Writers' Conference
Harlow named a top five fiction book of the year (2013) by The Richmond Times-Dispatch
Harlow longlisted for the 2013 SIBA Book Award 
The Pugilist's Wife named a New & Noteworthy Book by Newpages.com 
The Pugilist's Wife named one of five "Hot Reads" by the New Orleans Times-Picayune in March 2012  
The Pugilist's Wife named the winner of the 2010 George Garrett Fiction Prize

Bibliography 
Mirrors, and other reflections (essays) 
The Evangelist (poems) 
The Lord's Acre (a novel) 
Debt (poems) 
My Mother's House (a memoir) 
The Deep Woods (poems) 
The Gorge (a novel) 
Harlow (a novel) 
The Pugilist's Wife (a novel)

References

External links 
 Author's web site
 Profile on Goodreads
 Library Holdings
 Interview with Oxford American
 Interview with Deep South Magazine
 Interview with the New Orleans Review
 Interview with Sheba Turk on "The 504"
 Armand reading from Harlow at the Louisiana Humanities Center
 Armand reading at Southeastern Louisiana University
 NPR Interview

Further reading 

 

 

 

 

 

 

 

 

 

1980 births
Living people
21st-century American novelists
21st-century American poets
American male novelists
American male poets
21st-century American memoirists
American fiction writers
21st-century American male writers
Novelists from Louisiana
American male non-fiction writers